Blepharidium is a monotypic genus of flowering plants in the family Rubiaceae. The genus contains only one species, viz. Blepharidium guatemalense, which is native to Guatemala, Honduras and southern Mexico (Chiapas, Campeche, Tabasco). Older works might mention two species (viz. B. guatemalense and B. mexicanum).

Systematics 
Blepharidium was named by Paul Standley in 1918.<ref name="standley1918">{{cite journal | last1 = Standley | first1 = PC. | year = 1918 | title = Blepharidium page 59. In: "Blepharidium, a new genus of Rubiaceae from Guatemala" | journal = Journal of the Washington Academy of Sciences | volume = 8 | pages = 58–60 }}</ref> The name is derived from the Ancient Greek words blepharitis or blepharidos, meaning "on an eyelid". The similar term, blepharis means "an eyelash".

A cladistic analysis of morphological characters found Blepharidium to be closely related to Cosmibuena, Balmea, and Hillia, but a molecular phylogenetic study placed it closer to Rondeletia''.

References

External links 
 Blepharidium in the World Checklist of Rubiaceae
 Blepharidium At:Index Nominum Genericorum At: References At: NMNH Department of Botany At: Research and Collections At: Smithsonian National Museum of Natural History
 Blepharidium At: Plant Names At: IPNI
 Blepharidium In: volume 8 Of: Journal of the Washington Academy of Sciences At: Titles At: Biodiversity Heritage Library
 CRC World Dictionary of Plant Names: A-C At: Botany & Plant Science At: Life Science At: CRC Press

 
Flora of Guatemala
Flora of Honduras
Flora of Chiapas
Flora of Campeche
Flora of Tabasco
Monotypic Rubiaceae genera
Endangered biota of Mexico
Endangered plants
Taxonomy articles created by Polbot